Prunus apetala is a species of flowering cherry in the genus Prunus in the family Rosaceae. It is called clove cherry because of its clovebud-shaped calyx. It is native to Japan, centered on the main island, Honshu.

Description
Shrub or small tree.
Height: To 5.5 m (18 ft).
Leaves: Obovate leaves reach 5–10 cm (2–4 in) in length. Leaf tips are slender; leaf margins double-toothed. Petioles (leaf stalks) and upper leaf surfaces are hairy.
Inflorescences: Flowers in May.
Petals: Range in color from white to pink; small, 'soon falling'.
Calyx: Purple.
Stamens: Purple.
Pedicels: 1.25-1.9 cm (.5-.75in) in length.
Fruit: Black in color, roundish-oval in shape.
Peduncle: Peduncle (fruit stalk) ranges in length from 2.5-3.8 cm (1-1.5 in).

Etymology
Prunus is the ancient Latin name for plum trees. The specific epithet apetala is derived from Greek, meaning 'without petals', due to their habit of dropping off the flowers soon after they are formed.

References

External links
 

apetala
Ornamental trees
Endemic flora of Japan